"Burning Up" is a song written and recorded by American singer Madonna included on her 1983 self-titled debut album, released as a single on March 9, 1983. The song was presented as an early recorded demo by Madonna to Sire Records who green-lighted the recording of the single after her previous release, "Everybody", became a dance hit. Madonna collaborated with Reggie Lucas, who produced the single, while John Benitez provided the guitar riffs and backing vocals. Musically, the song incorporates instrumentation from bass guitar, synthesizers and drums, with the lyrics talking of the singer's lack of shame in declaring her passion for her lover.

Released with "Physical Attraction", another song from the album, as its B-side, "Burning Up" was given generally positive reviews from contemporary critics and authors, who noted the song's darker, urgent composition and praised its dance beats. It charted at number 13 in Australia and number three on the United States Dance Club Songs component chart. After a number of live appearances in nightclubs to promote it, it was added to the set-list of the Virgin (1985), Re-Invention (2004) and Rebel Heart (2015–2016) concert tours; on these last two, the singer performed rock-inspired versions and played electric guitar.

The accompanying music video of the song portrayed Madonna in classic submissive female positions, writhing in passion on an empty road while waiting for her lover who drives toward her in a car. This video ends with Madonna driving the car, with an interpretation that she is in charge. Many authors noted that the "Burning Up" music video was a beginning of Madonna's depiction of her taking control of a destabilized male sexuality.

Background  
In 1980, Madonna was living in New York and trying to launch her musical career. Steve Bray, her former boyfriend from Detroit, became the drummer for her band.  After deciding to abandon the hard rock sound, they were signed by a music management company, Gotham records, and decided to pursue music in the funk genre, but soon dropped those plans as well. Madonna carried rough tapes of three songs with her: "Everybody", "Ain't No Big Deal" and "Burning Up"; she presented "Everybody" to DJ Mark Kamins who, after hearing the song, took her to Sire Records, and she was signed for a single deal. When "Everybody" became a dance hit, Sire Records decided to follow up with an album. However, Madonna chose not to work with either Bray or Kamins, opting instead for Warner Brothers producer Reggie Lucas. Michael Rosenblatt, the A&R director of Sire Records, explained to Kamins that they wanted a producer who had more experience in directing singers; hence they appointed Lucas. The latter pushed Madonna in a more pop direction and produced "Burning Up" and "Physical Attraction" for her.

While producing the tracks, Lucas radically changed their structure from the original demo versions. Madonna was not pleased with this, so she called John "Jellybean" Benitez, a DJ at the Funhouse Disco, to remix the tracks. Benitez added some extra guitar riffs and vocals to "Burning Up". Sire Records backed up the single by sending Madonna on a series of personal appearances in clubs around New York, where she performed the single. They also hired a stylist and jewelry designer named Maripol. The final cover for the 12-inch dance single for "Burning Up" was designed by the singer's friend Martin Burgoyne. The track was then used as background music for a scene in the 1984 film The Wild Life and, 25 years later, included on Madonna's greatest hits album Celebration.

 Composition 

Musically, "Burning Up" has a starker arrangement brought about by bass, single guitar and drum machine. The guitar riffs in the songs were not characteristics of Madonna's later records, while the tom-tom drum beats used in the song were reminiscent of the records of singer Phil Collins. It also incorporated electric guitars and the "most state-of-the-art" synthesizers of that time. The chorus is a repetition of the same three lines of the lyrics, while the bridge consists of a series of double entendres in regards to the lyrics of the song which describe what she is prepared to do for her lover and that she is individualistic and shameless. According to the sheet music published at Musicnotes.com by Alfred Publishing, "Burning Up" is written in the time signature of common time with a dance beat tempo of 138 beats per minute. The song is composed in the key of B minor, with Madonna's vocals ranging from the tonal nodes of A3 to B4. The song follows a basic sequence of Bm–Bm–A–E as its chord progression.

 Release and reception 

The single was released on March 9, 1983, following "Everybody"; it did not enter the Billboard Hot 100 chart nor the Bubbling Under Hot 100 chart. It did, however, peak at number three on the Billboard Hot Dance Club Play, where it remained for 16 weeks. By September 1983, according to a Warner Bros. Records advertisement in Radio & Records, the "Burning Up"/"Physical Attraction" single had sold more than 150,000 copies. The song entered Australia's Kent Music Report in November 1983 and, almost eight months later, peaked at number 13.

Critical reception to "Burning Up" has been generally positive. Rikky Rooksby, author of  The Complete Guide to the Music of Madonna, commented that it was noticeably weaker compared to other songs from the album like "Lucky Star" and "Borderline". On his biography of the singer, J. Randy Taraborrelli described it as a "yearning" track. Author Santiago Fouz-Hernández, in Madonna's Drowned Worlds, complimented it for having upbeat dance music. While Joshua Ostroff, from the Canadian edition of the HuffPost, called it "semi-obscure", Rolling Stones Don Shewey said it was "simple stuff [...] but it's clever at times, too". From AllMusic, Stephen Thomas Erlewine noted that both "Burning Up" and B side "Physical Attraction" had a darker, carnal urgency in their composition. Robert Christgau referred to the 12-inch pair of "Burning Up" and "Physical Attraction" as "electroporn". The Canadian Press Angela Pacienza hailed it a "syrupy pop ditty". Writing for Entertainment Weekly, Jim Farber said commented that "Burning Up" proved that Madonna could also "rock". A less favorable review came from The Washington Times, who felt it wasn't among the singer's best songs and called it "a nugget better left buried".

Retrospective reviews have been positive; for BBC News' Mark Savage, it's one of the singer's "overlooked gems" that "still sounds like a mission statement", particularly in the lyrics I'll do anything, I'm not the same, I have no shame, I'm on fire. On a similar note, Alex Needham from The Guardian opined it was a manifesto that "still grabs you by the throat". Similarly, while reviewing the Madonna album on its 35th anniversary for The Quietus, Matthew Lindsay classified the song as a "brazen manifesto" that "borders on feral". Adam Graham, from The Detroit News, called it "underappreciated". According to Billboards Chris Malone Méndez, "Burning Up" was "a crucial component" in establishing Madonna's career; compared to the singer's previous single, "Everybody", which had mostly a post-disco sound, "Burning Up" saw her moving in a more pop-oriented path. For Matthew Jacobs from the HuffPost, it was an "outtake from the punk persona [Madonna] never fully embraced", while for PinkNews Mayer Nissim, it "wouldn't sound out of place on an early New Order or late Joy Division record".  Louis Virtel from The Backlot said that "as much as Madonna was something of a tartier Pat Benatar when she first arrived, she was also inspired by the punks of NYC – and this barebones, breathy war cry proves it". Mark Lore, writing for the Portland Mercury, said both "Everybody" and "Burning Up" were "true gems, gritty New York anthems overshadowed by the sparkly classics 'Borderline' and 'Holiday'". Nerdist's Eric Diaz called it "one of her greatest hits, even though it really wasn't". According to Gay Star News Joe Morgan, "Burning Up" showed Madonna "had a little bit of edge to her".

The staff from The Advocate considered "Burning Up" "one of the sexiest songs of the [1980s] decade". The Arizona Republics Ed Masley compared it to Michael Jackson's "Beat It", also saying it had "the personality that would go on to help define the decade fully formed — playful, assertive and sexy". He named it Madonna's 21st greatest song. On his ranking of Madonna's singles, in honor of her 60th birthday, Entertainment Weeklys Chuck Arnold placed "Burning Up" on the eleventh position; calling it "another shoulda-been hit", as well as the "most rocking thing she has ever done". Billboard also deemed it Madonna's eleventh greatest song; Joe Lynch called it "irresistible" and said that "[she] sounds less like a doormat and more like a pioneer of female Big Dick Energy". Samuel R. Murrian from Parade placed it at number 32 of his ranking and highlighted out its production. It figured on the same position of Slants list; Paul Schroeder called it one of the singer's "most aggressive" songs. The staff of Rolling Stone also considered it one of the singer's best and classified it as a "freestyle electro-jam". Idolators Robbie Daw considered "Burning Up" as one of Madonna's "10 best songs that radio forgot". Finally, The National Students Emily D'Souza hailed it Madonna's third most underrated song, calling it an "irresistibly catchy, quintessentially 80s" track.

 Music video 
 Background 

Sire Records commissioned a music video for "Burning Up" directed by Steve Barron; Barron had previously directed Michael Jackson's "Billie Jean", Toto's "Africa" and Eddy Grant's "Electric Avenue". At the time, Barron was on vacations when he got a call from Sire Records producer Simon Fields asking him to direct the video. The director initially refused, as the song "didn't have the atmosphere" he was looking for and wouldn't know what to do with it. However, Madonna, who was "really keen on the 'Billie Jean' video", insisted until Barron begrudgingly agreed. He went to meet the singer in New York and was impressed with her confidence. He would later recall:
I went to New York to meet with [Madonna], begrudgingly, and showed up at an address at SoHo, which turned out to be a squat basically. Madonna was scantily clad, working out to a massive disco track. She was charismatic. She kept putting her head down on the table and talking to me, very flirtatious, and that gave me the idea for the scene in "Burning Up", where her face is on the road, and the camera's really low and close.
Filming took places for two nights in Los Angeles. The "mish-mash" concept of the video was based on Barron's ideas as opposed to the lyrics and theme of the song, as he still "didn't connect with it too much". According to him, Madonna was "very much in charge" of her look and clothes; she ended up wearing a white mini-dress, crucifix earrings and black typewriter belts as bracelets. Actress Debi Mazar, Madonna's personal friend, was hired as the make-up artist, while her then boyfriend Ken Compton was hired to play the role of her onscreen lover. During a 2015 interview with Rolling Stone, Barron recalled that a seven-ton crane that stretched out and had a camera placed on it, was used to shoot scenes of the singer lying in a boat at night; Barron also remembered how on one moment, the crane almost fell right on top of the singer. The video was included on 2009's Celebration: The Video Collection.

 Analysis and reception Rolling Stone staff described the video as a juxtaposition of "disparate images of illuminated busts and cars driving on water with Madonna writhing in the middle of the road". The narrative shows Madonna proclaiming her passion for her lover, being portrayed as a "helpless" victim and a "stereotyped [female] portrayed in many silent movies". Though lyrics such as "Do you want to see me down on my knees?" portray female helplessness, the video acts as a counter-text; when this line is sung, Madonna is shown kneeling on the road in front of the advancing Amphicar, then turns her head back while exposing her throat back in a posture of submission. However, her voice tone and her look at the camera portray a hardness and defiance that contradict the submissiveness of her body posture and turn the question of the line into a challenge for her lover. At the end of the video, it is her who is driving the car, with a knowing, defiant smile on her lips. She has ditched the man, thereby giving the message that she is in charge. This theme would become recurrent throughout her career.

Author Andrew Morton, in his biography on Madonna, commented that the video was America's first introduction to Madonna's sexual politics. Author Robert Clyde Allen in his book Channels of Discourse compared the video to "Material Girl" (1985). According to him, both videos have an undermining ending, while employing a consistent series of puns and exhibiting a parodic amount of excess associated with Madonna's style. The discourses included in the video are those of sexuality and religion. Allen wrote that Madonna's image of kneeling and singing about "Burning in love" performed the traditional ideological work of using the subordination and powerlessness of women in Christianity to naturalize their equally submissive position in patriarchy. Author Georges-Claude Guilbert in his book Madonna as postmodern myth commented that the representation of the male character becomes irrelevant as Madonna destabilizes the fixing and categorization of male sexuality in the video. Her utterance of having "no shame" was interpreted by author James B. Twitchell, in his book For Shame, as an attempt to separate herself from contemporary female artists of that era.

To the staff of Rolling Stone, it can be seen as a "great testament to the anything-goes era of early MTV". Jon Pareles, writing for The New York Times, compared Madonna's poses to those of Marilyn Monroe. Louis Virtel deemed it Madonna's 18th greatest video and wrote: "Before [Madonna] humped the stage of the MTV Video Music Awards in a wedding dress, she thrusted away at pavement in a chintzier white ensemble". It was ranked her 13th best by Eric Diaz, who went on to call it "iconic" and a "classic". He further wrote that "there is something [about 'Burning Up'] that is just so '80s, and so Madonna - the rubber bracelets, the chains, the bleach blonde hair with the terrible roots. When girls today dress up like '80s Madonna' for Halloween, it's the look from this video they're emulating".

 Live performances and covers 

Before its official release, Madonna promoted the single by performing at different clubs around New York, where she was assisted by dancers Erika Belle and Bags Rilezz. She then traveled to London to promote it in clubs like Heaven, Camden Palace, Beatroot Club as well as The Haçienda in Manchester. However, those performances were not well received by the British audience. The song was then included on three of the singer's concert tours: Virgin (1985), Re-Invention (2004) and Rebel Heart (2015–2016). On the first one, it was performed before the encore and found Madonna, decked in a black outfit of matching fringed top and mini-skirt, suggestively posing around her band; orange lights bathed the stage. The Dallas Morning News Mikel Longoria praised the performance for being "crisp and energetic". "Burning Up" was one of three performances not included on the Madonna Live: The Virgin Tour video release.

For 2004's Re-Invention World Tour, it was performed in a rock-style version with the singer playing a black Gibson Les Paul electric guitar. She was dressed in military fatigues while the screens behind her depicted scenes of war and sex which, according to The New York Times Kelefa Sanneh, look liked they were filmed with a camcorder and were reminiscent of the prisons in Abu Ghraib. The Daily Heralds Mark Guarino praised Madonna's ability to "transform the song's original adolescent whine into adult certitude"; Neva Chonin, writing for the San Francisco Chronicle, deemed the performance a "singer-songwriter spotlight as Madonna showed off her competent guitar skills".

Eleven years later, "Burning Up" was performed as the third number of Madonna's Rebel Heart Tour; similar to Re-Invention, the artist sang a rock rendition of the track while playing a Gibson Flying V electric guitar. During the performance, she knelt on the stage for the guitar solo and then ripped off her skirt to reveal a "barely there" nun's outfit. Joey DiGuglielmo, from the Washington Blade, felt the singer gave a "thrashy and spare" rendition of the song, while Sandra Sperounes, from the Edmonton Journal, opined her voice sounded "deep and dangerous". Rappler's Nicole Reyes pointed out Madonna "oozed attitude and charisma" during the number. The performance of the song at the March 19–20, 2016 shows in Sydney's Allphones Arena was recorded and released on the artist's fifth live album, Rebel Heart Tour (2017).

"Burning Up" was covered by singer Isadar on his 2006 compilation album, Scratching The Surface: Vol 2 Electro-Voice Sampler. During Madonna's induction at the 2008 Rock and Roll Hall of Fame, Iggy Pop and The Stooges performed "punked-up" renditions of "Burning Up" and "Ray of Light" (1998). Two years later, it was covered by Jonathan Groff for American television show Glee; his version was included in an extended play titled Glee: The Music, The Power of Madonna. Finally, Britney Spears covered the song on her 2011 Femme Fatale Tour. The performance found Spears straddling a giant, glittering guitar; it received a mixed review from Rolling Stones Barry Walters, who felt it "lacked Madge's authority". A studio recording of the cover, described by Billboard''s Sarah Maloy as "glammed-up without a hint of the '80s to be found", leaked on June 10 of that year.

Track listing and formats

 U.S. / Europe /  Australia 12" Single
"Burning Up" (12" Version) – 5:56
"Physical Attraction" (LP Version) – 6:35

 FRA/GER/NED/BEL/JPN 7" Single
"Burning Up" (7" Version) – 3:50
"Physical Attraction" (7" Version) – 3:57

 Australia 7" Single
"Burning Up" (Alternate LP Version) – 4:48
"Physical Attraction" (7" Version) – 3:52

Germany / UK CD Maxi Single (1995)
"Burning Up" (12" Version) – 5:56
"Physical Attraction" (LP Version) – 6:34

U.S. / double A-sided promo 7" (1983)
"Physical Attraction" (Single Edit) / Sire PRO-A-2023 – 3:57

Digital single
"Burning Up" – 3:46
"Burning Up" (7" Edit) – 3:52
"Burning Up" (12" Mix) – 6:00
"Physical Attraction" (7" Edit) – 3:58
"Physical Attraction" – 6:40

Credits and personnel
Madonna – lead vocals, background vocals, writer
Reggie Lucas – producer, guitars, drum programming
Butch Jones – synthesizer
John "Jellybean" Benitez – remixing
Fred Zarr – synthesizer, electric and acoustic piano
Dean Gant – electric and acoustic piano
Bobby Malach – tenor saxophone
Paul Pesco - guitar
Ed Walsh – synthesizer
Gwen Guthrie – background vocals
Brenda White – background vocals
Chrissy Faith – background vocals
Martin Burgoyne - artwork

Credits adapted from the album and the single liner notes.

Charts

Weekly charts

Year-end charts

References

Bibliography

External links

1983 songs
1983 singles
American rock songs
Dance-rock songs
Madonna songs
Post-disco songs
Sire Records singles
Music videos directed by Steve Barron
Songs written by Madonna
Sonic Youth songs
Song recordings produced by Reggie Lucas